The Boys' Youth Pan-American Volleyball Cup is a bi-annual Continental Cup organized by NORCECA for U19 teams from North- and Central America, and the Caribbean.

History

Medal table

See also
 Men's Pan-American Volleyball Cup
 Men's Junior Pan-American Volleyball Cup
 Girls' Youth Pan-American Volleyball Cup

References

External links
 NORCECA

Pan-American Volleyball Cup
Men's Pan-American Volleyball Cup
Recurring sporting events established in 2011